Abbas Fallah (born September 3, 1976) is an Iranian judoka.

Participating at the 2004 Olympic Games, he was stopped in the round of 32 by Keith Morgan of Canada. He finished in joint fifth place in the half-heavyweight (100 kg) division at the 2006 Asian Games, having lost to Askhat Zhitkeyev of Kazakhstan in the bronze medal match.

External links
2006 Asian Games profile
Judo videos of Abbas Fallah in action (judovision.org)

1976 births
Living people
Iranian male judoka
Judoka at the 2004 Summer Olympics
Olympic judoka of Iran
Asian Games bronze medalists for Iran
Asian Games medalists in judo
Judoka at the 2002 Asian Games
Judoka at the 2006 Asian Games
Medalists at the 2002 Asian Games
20th-century Iranian people
21st-century Iranian people